The Gambia national under-17 football team is the U-17 football team of the Gambia and is controlled by the Gambia Football Federation.

History 
The team won the Africa U-17 Cup of Nations in 2005 & 2009. The 2005 team caused one of the biggest upsets in FIFA U-17 World Cup history after defeating Brazil 3–1.Captain of the team (2005) was Ousman Koli.

Competitive record

FIFA U-17 World Cup record

Africa U-17 Cup of Nations record

CAF U-16 and U-17 World Cup Qualifiers record

References

African national under-17 association football teams
Gambia national football team